Henry Arthur "Hurricane Howie" Meeking (November 4, 1894 – December 13, 1971) was a Canadian professional ice hockey player who played three seasons in the National Hockey League for the Toronto Arenas, Detroit Cougars and Boston Bruins. He was born in Berlin, Ontario.

His brother Gordon Meeking was also a hockey player.

Playing career
Meeking won a Stanley Cup in the inaugural season of the NHL with the Arenas. After playing his first 2 years in the newly formed National League, Meeking would spend the next 7 years playing in the PCHL, WCHL and CPHL before returning to the NHL for one more season in 1926–27. He started that season with the Detroit Cougars but would finish his NHL career in Boston after being traded with Frank Fredrickson. Meeking also won the Stanley Cup as a member of the PCHL's Victoria Cougars in 1925 who were the last team outside of the NHL to challenge for and win the coveted title.

Perfect hand
It was reported in 1963 that Meeking, then aged 69, had recently held a perfect 29 hand in a game of cribbage, which he had played for 50 years.

Career statistics

Regular season and playoffs

References

External links

1894 births
1971 deaths
Boston Bruins players
Detroit Cougars players
Canadian ice hockey left wingers
Ice hockey people from Ontario
London Panthers players
New Haven Eagles players
Sportspeople from Kitchener, Ontario
Stanley Cup champions
Toronto Arenas players
Toronto Blueshirts players
Victoria Aristocrats players
Victoria Cougars (1911–1926) players
Windsor Bulldogs (CPHL) players